Jack M. Lauzon (born December 5, 1961) is a Canadian retired Thoroughbred horse racing jockey whom The Blood-Horse magazine called "one of the most respected riders in Canada."

Lauzon began his professional riding career in 1981 and met with considerable success at Fort Erie Racetrack, Greenwood Raceway and Woodbine Racetrack and won races in the United States. He is a two-time winner of Canada's most prestigious race, the Queen's Plate. He won his first Plate in 1988 aboard Regal Intention then the following year missed winning the race again when his horse was beaten by less than a nose. In 1994 he won his second Plate aboard Basqueian plus went on that year to win the third leg of the Canadian Triple Crown series, the Breeders' Stakes.

Accident and recovery
In August 1996 Jack Lauzon was competing at the Macau Jockey Club near Hong Kong when he was involved in a racing accident that most believed would end his career. He was paralysed from the chest down after fracturing three vertebrae and was within a hair of severing his spinal cord. After more than two and half years of painful rehabilitation therapy, he returned to racing  in April 1999.  In 2005, writer/broadcaster Peter Gross won a Sovereign Award for Outstanding Newspaper Article with the story of Lauzon's accident and recovery titled "The Amazing Story of Jack Lauzon" which appeared in The Game newspaper.

Jack Lauzon retired in 2007 and became a jockey's agent. As a Agent for Omar Moreno guided Omar to become a Two-time Sovereign Award (Canada) and  Eclipse Award (America) Leading Apprentice.

With  His contribution to the sport of Thoroughbred racing was honoured with the 2008 Avelino Gomez Memorial Award.

References
 May 22, 2008 Bloodhorse.com article titled Jack Lauzon Wins Avelino Gomez Award
 The 2005 Sovereign Awards at Horse-races.net

1961 births
Avelino Gomez Memorial Award winners
Canadian jockeys
People from Welland
Living people